Al-Ghazali ( – 19 December 1111), full name , and known in Persian-speaking countries as Imam Muhammad-i Ghazali (Persian: امام محمد غزالی) or in Medieval Europe by the Latinized as Algazelus or Algazel, was a Sunni Muslim Persian polymath. He is known as one of the most prominent and influential jurisconsults, legal theorists, muftis, philosophers, theologians, logicians and mystics of the Islamic Golden Age.

He is considered to be the 11th century's mujaddid, a renewer of the faith, who, according to the prophetic hadith, appears once every 100 years to restore the faith of the Islamic community. Al-Ghazali's works were so highly acclaimed by his contemporaries that he was awarded the honorific title "Proof of Islam" (Ḥujjat al-Islām).

Much of Al-Ghazali's work stemmed around his spiritual crises following his appointment as the head of the Nizzamiyya University in Baghdad - which was the most prestigious academic position in the Muslim world at the time. This led to his eventual disappearance from the Muslim world for over 10 years. It was during this period where many of his great works were written. He believed that the Islamic spiritual tradition had become moribund and that the spiritual sciences taught by the first generation of Muslims had been forgotten. This belief led him to write his magnum opus entitled Iḥyā’ ‘ulūm ad-dīn ("The Revival of the Religious Sciences"). Among his other works, the Tahāfut al-Falāsifa ("Incoherence of the Philosophers") is a landmark in the history of philosophy, as it advances the critique of Aristotelian science developed later in 14th-century Europe.

Life 
He was a Muslim scholar, law specialist, rationalist, and spiritualist of Persian descent. He was born in Tabaran, a town in the district of Tus, Khorasan (now part of Iran), not long after Seljuks entered Baghdad and ended Shia Buyid Amir al-umaras. This marked the start of Seljuk influence over Caliphate. While the Seljuk dynasty's influence grew, Abu Suleiman Dawud Chaghri Beg married his daughter, Arslan Khatun Khadija to caliph al-Qa'im in 1056.

A posthumous tradition, the authenticity of which has been questioned in recent scholarship, is that his father died in poverty and left the young al-Ghazali and his brother Ahmad to the care of a Sufi. Al-Ghazali's contemporary and first biographer, 'Abd al-Ghafir al-Farisi, records merely that al-Ghazali began to receive instruction in fiqh (Islamic jurisprudence) from Ahmad al-Radhakani, a local teacher and Abu ali Farmadi, a Naqshbandi sufi from Tus. He later studied under al-Juwayni, the distinguished jurist and theologian and "the most outstanding Muslim scholar of his time," in Nishapur, perhaps after a period of study in Gurgan. After al-Juwayni's death in 1085, al-Ghazali departed from Nishapur and joined the court of Nizam al-Mulk, the powerful vizier of the Seljuk empire, which was likely centered in Isfahan. After bestowing upon him the titles of "Brilliance of the Religion" and "Eminence among the Religious Leaders," Nizam al-Mulk advanced al-Ghazali in July 1091 to the "most prestigious and most challenging" professorial position at the time: the Nizamiyya madrasa in Baghdad.

He underwent a spiritual crisis in 1095, which some speculate was brought on by clinical hysteria, abandoned his career and left Baghdad on the pretext of going on pilgrimage to Mecca. Making arrangements for his family, he disposed of his wealth and adopted an ascetic lifestyle. According to biographer Duncan B. Macdonald, the purpose of abstaining from scholastic work was to confront the spiritual experience and more ordinary understanding of "the Word and the Traditions." After some time in Damascus and Jerusalem, with a visit to Medina and Mecca in 1096, he returned to Tus to spend the next several years in uzla (seclusion). The seclusion consisted in abstaining from teaching at state-sponsored institutions, but he continued to publish, receive visitors and teach in the zawiya (private madrasa) and khanqah (Sufi lodge) that he had built.

Fakhr al-Mulk, grand vizier to Ahmad Sanjar, pressed al-Ghazali to return to the Nizamiyya in Nishapur. Al-Ghazali reluctantly capitulated in 1106, fearing rightly that he and his teachings would meet with resistance and controversy. He later returned to Tus and declined an invitation in 1110 from the grand vizier of the Seljuq Sultan Muhammad I to return to Baghdad. He died on 19 December 1111. According to 'Abd al-Ghafir al-Farisi, he had several daughters but no sons.

School affiliations 

Al-Ghazali contributed significantly to the development of a systematic view of Sufism and its integration and acceptance in mainstream Islam. As a scholar of Sunni Islam, he belonged to the Shafi'i school of Islamic jurisprudence and to the Asharite school of theology. Al-Ghazali received many titles such as Zayn al-Dīn and Ḥujjat al-Islām.

He is viewed as the key member of the influential Asharite school of early Muslim philosophy and the most important refuter of the Mutazilites. However, he chose a slightly different position in comparison with the Asharites. His beliefs and thoughts differ in some aspects from the orthodox Asharite school.

Works 

A total of about 70 works can be attributed to al-Ghazali. He is also known to have written a fatwa against the Taifa kings of al-Andalus, declaring them to be unprincipled, not fit to rule and that they should be removed from power. This fatwa was used by Yusuf ibn Tashfin to justify his conquest of al-Andalus.

Incoherence of the Philosophers 
His 11th century book titled The Incoherence of the Philosophers marks a major turn in Islamic epistemology. The encounter with skepticism led al-Ghazali to investigate a form of theological occasionalism, or the belief that all causal events and interactions are not the product of material conjunctions but rather the immediate and present will of God.

In the next century, Ibn Rushd (or Averroes) drafted a lengthy rebuttal of al-Ghazali's Incoherence entitled The Incoherence of the Incoherence; however, the epistemological course of Islamic thought had already been set.  Al-Ghazali gave as an example of the illusion of independent laws of cause the fact that cotton burns when coming into contact with fire.  While it might seem as though a natural law was at work, it happened each and every time only because God willed it to happen—the event was "a direct product of divine intervention as any more attention grabbing miracle". Averroes, by contrast insisted while God created the natural law, humans "could more usefully say that fire caused cotton to burn—because creation had a pattern that they could discern."

The Incoherence also marked a turning point in Islamic philosophy in its vehement rejections of Aristotle and Plato. The book took aim at the falasifa, a loosely defined group of Islamic philosophers from the 8th through the 11th centuries (most notable among them Avicenna and al-Farabi) who drew intellectually upon the Ancient Greeks.

This long-held argument has been criticized. 
George Saliba in 2007 argued that the decline of science in the 11th century has been overstated, pointing to continuing advances, particularly in astronomy, as late as the 14th century.
On the other hand, author and journalist Hassan Hassan in 2012 argued that while indeed scientific thought in Islam was stifled in the 11th century, the person mostly to blame is not al-Ghazali but Nizam al-Mulk.

Autobiography 

The autobiography al-Ghazali wrote towards the end of his life, Deliverance From Error ( al-munqidh min al-ḍalāl), is considered a work of major importance. In it, al-Ghazali recounts how, once a crisis of epistemological skepticism had been resolved by "a light which God Most High cast into my breast ... the key to most knowledge," he studied and mastered the arguments of kalam, Islamic philosophy, and Ismailism. Though appreciating what was valid in the first two of these, at least, he determined that all three approaches were inadequate and found ultimate value only in the mystical experience and insight he attained as a result of following Sufi practices. William James, in Varieties of Religious Experience, considered the autobiography an important document for "the purely literary student who would like to become acquainted with the inwardness of religions other than the Christian" because of the scarcity of recorded personal religious confessions and autobiographical literature from this period outside the Christian tradition.

The Revival of Religious Sciences (Ihya' Ulum al-Din) 

Another of al-Ghazali's major works is Ihya' Ulum al-Din or Ihya'u Ulumiddin (The Revival of Religious Sciences). It covers almost all fields of Islamic sciences: fiqh (Islamic jurisprudence), kalam (theology) and sufism.

It contains four major sections: Acts of worship, Norms of Daily Life, The ways to Perdition and The Ways to Salvation. The  became the most frequently recited Islamic text after the Qur'an and the hadith. Its great achievement was to bring orthodox Sunni theology and Sufi mysticism together in a useful, comprehensive guide to every aspect of Muslim life and death. The book was well received by Islamic scholars such as Nawawi who stated that: "Were the books of Islam all to be lost, excepting only the Ihya', it would suffice to replace them all."

The Alchemy of Happiness 

The Alchemy of Happiness is a rewritten version of The Revival of the Religious Sciences. After the existential crisis that caused him to completely re-examine his way of living and his approach to religion, al-Ghazali put together The Alchemy of Happiness to reassert his fundamental belief that a connection to God was an integral part of the joy of living. The book is divided into four different sections. The first of these is Knowledge of Self, where al-Ghazali asserts that while food, sex, and other indulgences might slake humans appetites temporarily, they in turn make a human into an animal, and therefore will never give true happiness and fulfillment. In order to find oneself, people must devote themselves to God by showing restraint and discipline rather than gluttony of the senses. The second installment is called Knowledge of God, where al-Ghazali states that the events that occur during one's life are meant to point an individual towards God, and that God will always be strong, no matter how far humans deviate from His will. The third section of The Alchemy of Happiness is Knowledge of the World. Here he states that the world is merely a place where humans learn to love God, and prepare for the future, or the afterlife, the nature of which will be determined by our actions in this phase of our journey to happiness. The final section is Knowledge of the Future World, which details how there are two types of spirits within a man: the angelic spirit and the animal spirit. Al-Ghazali details the types of spiritual tortures unbelievers experience, as well as the path that must be taken in order to attain spiritual enlightenment. This book serves as a culmination of the transformation Ghazali goes through during his spiritual awakening.

Disciplining the Soul 
One of the key sections of Ghazali's Revival of the Religious Sciences is Disciplining the Soul, which focuses on the internal struggles that every Muslim will face over the course of his lifetime. The first chapter primarily focuses on how one can develop himself into a person with positive attributes and good personal characteristics . The second chapter has a more specific focus: sexual satisfaction and gluttony. Here, Ghazali states that indeed every man has these desires and needs, and that it is natural to want these things. However, the Prophet explicitly states that there must be a middle ground for man, in order to practice the tenets of Islam faithfully. The ultimate goal that Ghazali is presenting not only in these two chapters, but in the entirety of The Revival of the Religious Sciences, is that there must be moderation in every aspect of the soul of a man, an equilibrium. These two chapters were the 22nd and 23rd chapters, respectively, in Ghazali's Revival of the Religious Sciences. It's also important to note here that Ghazali draws from Greek as well as Islamic philosophy in crafting this literary staple, even though much of The Incoherence of the Philosophers, his most well known work, takes a critical aim at their perspective.

The Eternity of the World 
Al-Ghazali crafted his rebuttal of the Aristotelian viewpoint on the creation of the world in The Eternity of the World. Al-Ghazali essentially formulates two main arguments for what he views as a sacrilegious thought process. Central to the Aristotelian approach is the concept that motion will always precede motion, or in other words, a force will always create another force, and therefore for a force to be created, another force must act upon that force. This means that in essence time stretches infinitely both into the future and into the past, which therefore proves that God did not create the universe at one specific point in time. Al-Ghazali counters this by first stating that if the world was created with exact boundaries, then in its current form there would be no need for a time before the creation of the world by God.  The second argument al-Ghazali makes is that because humans can only imagine the time before the creation of the world, and your imagination is a fictional thing, that all the time before the world was created is fictional as well, and therefore does not matter as it was not intended by God to be understood by humans.

The Decisive Criterion for Distinguishing Islam from Clandestine Unbelief 
Al-Ghazali lays out in The Decisive Criterion for Distinguishing Islam from Clandestine Unbelief his approach to Muslim orthodoxy. Ghazali veers from the often hardline stance of many of his contemporaries during this time period and states that as long as one believes in the Prophet Muhammad and God himself, there are many different ways to practice Islam and that any of the many traditions practiced in good faith by believers should not be viewed as heretical by other Muslims. While Ghazali does state that any Muslim practicing Islam in good faith is not guilty of apostasy, he does outline in The Criterion that there is one standard of Islam that is more correct than the others, and that those practicing the faith incorrectly should be moved to change. In Ghazali's view, only the Prophet himself could deem a faithfully practicing Muslim an infidel, and his work was a reaction to the religious persecution and strife that occurred often during this time period between various Islamic sects.

Works in Persian 
Al-Ghazali wrote most of his works in Arabic and few in Persian. His most important Persian work is Kimiya-yi sa'adat (The Alchemy of Happiness). It is al-Ghazali's own Persian version of Ihya' 'ulum al-din (The Revival of Religious Sciences) in Arabic, but a shorter work. It is one of the outstanding works of 11th-century-Persian literature. The book was published several times in Tehran by the edition of Hussain Khadev-jam, a renowned Iranian scholar. It is translated to English, Arabic, Turkish, Urdu, Azerbaijani and other languages.

Another authentic work of al-Ghazali is the so-called “first part” of the Nasihat al-muluk (Counsel for kings), addressed to the Saljuqid ruler of Khurasan Ahmad b. Malik-shah Sanjar (r. 490-552/1097-1157). The text was written after an official reception at his court in 503/1109 and upon his request. Al-Ghazali was summoned to Sanjar because of the intrigues of his opponents and their criticism of his student's compilation in Arabic, al-Mankhul min taʿliqat al-usul (The sifted notes on the fundamentals), in addition to his refusal to continue teaching at the Nizamiya of Nishapur. After the reception, al-Ghazali had, apparently, a private audience with Sanjar, during which he quoted a verse from the Quran 14:24: “Have you not seen how Allah sets forth a parable of a beautiful phrase (being) like a beautiful tree, whose roots are firm and whose branches are in Heaven.” The genuine text of the Nasihat al-muluk, which is actually an official epistle with a short explanatory note on al-Manḵul added on its frontispiece  and the title given to it later, discloses the verse image of the “beautiful tree” (shajara tayyiba) consisting of ten roots and ten branches.

Faza'il al-anam min rasa'il Hujjat al-Islam is the collection of letters in Persian that al-Ghazali wrote in response to the kings, ministers, jurists and some of his friends after he returned to Khorasan. The collection was gathered by one of his grandchildren after his death, under five sections/chapters. The longest letter is the response to objections raised against some of his statements in Mishkat al-Anwar (The Niche of Light) and al-Munqidh min al-dalal (Rescuer from Error). The first letter is the one which al-Ghazali wrote to Sultan Sanjar presenting his excuse for teaching in Nizamiyya of Nishapur; followed by al-Ghazali's speech in the court of Sultan Sanjar. Al-Ghazali makes an impressive speech when he was taken to the king's court in Nishapur in 1106, giving very influential counsels, asking the sultan once again for excusing him from teaching in Nizamiyya. The sultan was so impressed that he ordered al-Ghazali to write down his speech so that it will be sent to all the ulemas of Khorasan and Iraq.

Zad-e Ākhirat (Provision for the hereafter) is an important Persian book of al-Ghazali but gained less scholarly attention. The greater part of it consists of the Persian translation of one of his Arabic books, Bidayat al-Hidaya (Beginning of Guidance). It contains in addition the same contents as the Kimiya-yi Sa'adat. The book was most probably written during the last years of his life. Its manuscripts are in Kabul (Library of the Department of Press) and in Leiden.

Another Persian work is Hamāqāt-i ahl-i ibahat or Radd-i ebāhīyya (Condemnation of antinomians) which is his fatwa in Persian illustrated with Quranic verses and Hadiths.

The majority of other Persian texts, ascribed to him with the use of his fame and authority, especially in the genre of Mirrors for Princes, are either deliberate forgeries fabricated with different purposes or compilations falsely attributed to him. The most famous among them is Ay farzand (O Child!). This is undoubtedly a literary forgery fabricated in Persian one or two generations after al-Ghazali's death. The sources used for the forgery consist of two genuine letters by al-Ghazali's (number 4, in part, and number 33, totally); both appear in the Fazaʾil al-anam. Another source is a letter known as ʿAyniya and written by Muhammad's younger brother Majd al-Din Ahmad al-Ghazali (d. 520/1126) to his famous disciple ʿAyn al-Quzat Hamadani (492-526/1098-1131); the letter was published in the Majmuʿa-yi athar-i farsi-yi Ahmad-i Ghazali (Collection of the Persian writings of Ahmad Ghazali). The other is ʿAyn al-Quzat's own letter, published in the Namaha-yi ʿAyn al-Quzat Hamadani (Letters by ʿAyn al-Quzat Hamadani). Later, Ay farzand was translated into Arabic and became famous as Ayyuha al-walad, the Arabic equivalent of the Persian title. The earliest manuscripts with the Arabic translation date from the second half of the 16th and most of the others from the 17th century. The earliest known secondary translation from Arabic into Ottoman Turkish was done in 983/1575. In modern times, the text was translated from Arabic into many European languages and published innumerable times in Turkey as Eyyühe’l-Veled or Ey Oğul.

A less famous Pand-nama (Book of counsel) also written in the genre of advice literature is a very late compilatory letter of an unknown author formally addressed to some ruler and falsely attributed to al-Ghazali, obviously because it consists of many fragments borrowed mostly from various parts of the Kimiya-yi saʿadat.

Influence 

During his life, he wrote over 70 books on science, Islamic reasoning and Sufism.  Al-Ghazali distributed his book The Incoherence of Philosophers, set apart as the defining moment in Islamic epistemology. The experience that he had with suspicion drove al-Ghazali to shape a conviction that all occasions and connections are not the result of material conjunctions but are the present and prompt will of God.

Another of al-Ghazali's most prestigious works is Ihya' Ulum al-Din ("The Revival of Religious Sciences"). The work covers all fields of Islamic science and incorporates Islamic statute, philosophy and Sufism. It had numerous positive reactions, and al-Ghazali at that point composed a condensed form in Persian under the title Kimiya-yi sa'adat ("The Alchemy of Happiness"). Although al-Ghazali said that he has composed more than 70 books, attributed to him are more than 400 books.

Al-Ghazali likewise assumed a noteworthy part in spreading Sufism and Sharia. He was the first to consolidate the ideas of Sufism into Sharia laws and the first to give a formal depiction of Sufism in his works. His works fortify the position of Sunni Islam, contrasted with different schools of thought.

Al-Ghazali had an important influence on both later Muslim philosophers and Christian medieval philosophers. Margaret Smith writes in her book Al-Ghazali: The Mystic (London 1944): "There can be no doubt that al-Ghazali’s works would be among the first to attract the attention of these European scholars" (page 220). Then she emphasizes, "The greatest of these Christian writers who was influenced by al-Ghazali was St. Thomas Aquinas (1225–1274), who made a study of the Arabic writers and admitted his indebtedness to them, having studied at the University of Naples where the influence of Arab literature and culture was predominant at the time." In addition, Aquinas' interest in Islamic studies could be attributed to the infiltration of ‘Latin Averroism’ in the 13th century, especially at the University of Paris.

The period following Ghazali "has tentatively been called the Golden Age of Arabic philosophy" initiated by Ghazali's successful integration of logic into the Islamic seminary Madrasah curriculum.

Al-Ghazali also played a major role in integrating Sufism with Shariah. He was also the first to present a formal description of Sufism in his works. His works also strengthened the status of Sunni Islam against other schools. The Batinite (Ismailism) had emerged in Persian territories and were gaining more and more power during al-Ghazali's period, as Nizam al-Mulk was assassinated by the members of Ismailis. In his Fada'ih al-Batiniyya (The Infamies of the Esotericists) al-Ghazali declared them unbelievers whose blood may be spilled, and wrote several books on criticism of Baatinyas which significantly weakened their status.

Al-Ghazali succeeded in gaining widespread acceptance for Sufism at the expense of philosophy. At the same time, in his refutation of philosophers he made use of their philosophical categories and thus helped to give them wider circulation.

His influences and impact on Sufi thought and Islam at large during the 11th century has been a subject of debate in contemporary times.  Some fifty works that he had written is evidenced that he was one of the most important Islamic thinkers of his time.  Three of his works, Ihaya' Ulum ad-Din (Revival of Religious Sciences), Tahafut al-Falasifa (The Incoherence of Philosophers), and al-Muniqidh min a-alal (al-Ghazali's Path to Sufism: His Deliverance from Error) are still widely read and circulated among Islamic scholars today.  After the death of al-Ghazali, it is believed there followed a long era in which there was a notable absence of Islamic philosophers, contributing to the status of Ghazali in the modern era.

The staple of his religious philosophy was arguing that the creator was the center point of all human life that played a direct role in all world affairs.  Al-Ghazali's influence was not limited to Islam, but in fact his works were widely circulated among Christian and Hebrew scholars and philosophers.  Some of the more notable philosophers and scholars in the west include David Hume, Dante, and St. Thomas Aquinas.  Moses Ben Maimon, a Jewish theologian was deeply interested and vested in the works of al-Ghazali.  One of the more notable achievements of Ghazali were his writing and reform of education that laid the path of Islamic Education from the 12th to the 19th centuries.  Al-Ghazali's works were heavily relied upon by Islamic mathematicians and astronomers such as At-Tusi.

Early childhood development was a central focal point of al-Ghazali.  He worked to influence and develop a program to mold the young minds of children at an early age to develop their mind and character.  He stressed that socialization, family, and schools were central in the achievement of language, morality, and behavior.  He emphasized incorporating physical fitness such as games that were important in the development of young minds to attract the idea of attending schools and maintaining an education.  In addition, he stressed the importance of understanding and sharing cultures in the classrooms to achieve a civic harmony that would be expressed outside the classroom and kindness to one another.

In his writings he placed this responsibility upon the teachers.  His treatise on early education centered on Islamic laws, God, and memorizing the Qur'an to achieve literary skill.  Ghazali emphasized the importance that there should be a dual respect in regard to the teacher and the pupil.  Whereas the teacher guides the student and takes the role of a father figure and offers council to the student, and the student respects the teacher as a patriarch.  He stressed that the teacher needed to pay attention to the learning paces of his students so that he could help them be successful in academic achievements.

Al-Ghazali was by every indication of his writings a true mystic in the Persian sense.  He believed himself to be more mystical or religious than he was philosophical however, he is more widely regarded by some scholars as a leading figure of Islamic philosophy and thought.  He describes his philosophical approach as a seeker of true knowledge, a deeper understanding of the philosophical and scientific, and a better understanding of mysticism and cognition.

In the contemporary world, al-Ghazali is renowned not only for his contribution to Sufism, Islam, philosophy, or education but his work and ethical approach transcends another boundary into the Islamic business practice.  In the Journal of Business Ethics, authors Yusif Sidani and Akram Al Ariss explain how Islamic business ethics are governed by the writings of Abu-Hamid al-Ghazali and even posit that al-Ghazali is the greatest Muslim since the prophet Muhammad.  Traditional Islamist's are influenced by Ghazali's writings since he was indebted to writing about and incorporating Sharia Law.  They emphasize, "His mastery of philosophical logic and reasoning earned him the title of philosopher without losing his status as a religious scholar."  Al-Ghazali's reasoning on the use of intellect in combination with the rational and spiritual is an integral part of Muslim society today.  Therefore, they approach the business perspective with the same ideology and organizational thought.

Number of works 
Al-Ghazali mentioned the number of his works "more than 70" in one of his letters to Sultan Sanjar in the late years of his life. Some "five dozen" are plausibly identifiable, and several hundred attributed works, many of them duplicates because of varying titles, are doubtful or spurious.

The tradition of falsely attributing works to al-Ghazali increased in the 13th century, after the dissemination of the large corpus of works by Ibn Arabi.

Bibliographies have been published by William Montgomery Watt (The Works Attributed to Al-Ghazali), Maurice Bouyges (Essai de chronologie des oeuvres d'Al-Ghazali) and others.

Reception of work 
According to William Montgomery Watt, al-Ghazali was considered to be the mujaddid ("Reviver") of his age. Many, perhaps most, later Muslims concurred and, according to Watt, some have even considered him to be the greatest Muslim after Muhammad.

As an example, the Islamic scholar al-Safadi stated: 

and the jurist, al-Yafi'i stated:

The Shafi'i jurist al-Subki stated:

Also a widely considered Sunni scholar, al-Dhahabi, in his praise of al-Ghazali wrote: "Al-Ghazzaali, the imaam and shaykh, the prominent scholar, Hujjat al-Islam, the wonder of his time, Zayn al-Deen Abu Haamid Muhammad ibn Muhammad ibn Muhammad ibn Ahmad al-Toosi al-Shaafa’i al-Ghazzaali, the author of many books and one possessed of utter intelligence. He studied fiqh in his own town, then he moved to Nisapur in the company of a group of students. He stayed with the Imaam al-Haramayn and gained a deep knowledge of fiqh within a short period. He became well-versed in ‘ilm al-kalaam and debate, until he became the best of debater."

Ibn Rushd (Averroes), a rationalist, famously responded that "to say that philosophers are incoherent is itself to make an incoherent statement." Rushd's book, The Incoherence of the Incoherence, attempted to refute al-Ghazali's views, but the work was not well received in the Muslim community.

According to historian Firas Alkhateeb, "When one reads Imam al-Ghazali's works at a very superficial level, one can easily misunderstand what he is saying as anti-scientific in general. The truth, however, is that al-Ghazali's only warning to students is to not fully accept all the beliefs and ideas of a scholar simply because of his achievements in mathematics and science. By issuing such a warning, al-Ghazali is in fact protecting the scientific enterprise for future generations by insulating it from being mixed with theoretical philosophy that could eventually dilute science itself to a field based on conjecture and reasoning alone."

Al-Ghazali has been seen by Orientalist scholars as causing a decline in scientific advancement in Islam, because of his refutation of the new philosophies of his time. He saw danger in the statements made by philosophers that suggested that God was not all-knowing or even non-existent, which strongly contradicted his conservative Islamic belief. This position has been challenged, however. The following statement made by al-Ghazali has been described as evidence that he was not against scientific advancement: "Great indeed is the crime against religion committed by anyone who supposes that Islam is to be championed by the denial of mathematical sciences." This sentence, the source of which is not indicated in the cited book, is taken from Deliverance from Error. Ghazali does not mean that neglecting the study of mathematics would be a crime against science or against reason, but that rejecting them is a crime against religion. Its aim is not to promote the study of mathematics: it is to condemn the attitude which consists in considering them as rivals of religion. For him, religion has nothing to fear from them, because they do not deal with the same subjects. To condemn the study of mathematics for fear that it endangers religion is to mistake the place of each of them. This is clarified by the sentence which immediately follows: "For the revealed Law nowhere undertakes to deny or affirm these sciences, and the latter nowhere address themselves to religious matters." A few pages later, he writes that the books of the philosophers must be banned - he defines philosophy as composed of six branches: mathematical, logical, physical, metaphysical, political, and morale. Al-Ghazali notably influenced Ibn Rushd,  Ayn al-Quzat Hamadani. al-Nawawi, Ibn Tumart, René Descartes, Fakhruddin Razi, Suyuti, Tan Malaka, Thomas Aquinas, David Hume, Sayf al-Din al-Amidi, Asad Mayhani, Ali al-Qari, Muhammad Ibn Yahya al-Janzi.

Economic philosophy 
Most aspects of al-Ghazali's life were heavily influenced by his Islamic beliefs, and his economic philosophy was no exception. He held economic activity to a very high level of importance in his life and thought that others should as well, as he felt that it was not only necessary for the overall benefit to society but also to achieve spiritual wholeness and salvation. In his view, the worldly life of humanity depended on the economic activity of people and so he considered being economically active to be a mandated part of the Sharia law.

He established three goals of economic activity that he believed were part of one's religious obligation as well as beneficial to the individual: "achievement of self-sufficiency for one's survival; provision for the well-being of one's progeny; and provision for assisting those in economic need." He argued that subsistence living, or living in a way that provides the basic necessities for only one's family, would not be an acceptable practice to be held by the general population because of the detrimental results that he believed that would bring upon the economy, but he acknowledged that some people may choose to live the subsistence lifestyle at their own will for the sake of their personal religious journey. Conversely, he discouraged people from purchasing or possessing excessive material items, suggesting that any additional money earned could be given to provide for the poor.

Al-Ghazali thought that it should not be necessary to force equality of income in society but that people should be driven by "the spirit of Islamic brotherhood" to share their wealth willingly, but he recognized that it is not always the case. He believed that wealth earned could be used in two potential manners. One is for good, such as maintaining the health of oneself and their family as well as taking care of others and any other actions seen as positive for the Islamic community. The other is what al-Ghazali would consider misuse, spending it selfishly on extravagant or unnecessary material items.

In terms of trade, al-Ghazali discussed the necessity of exchanging goods across close cities as well as larger borders because it allows more goods, which may be necessary and not yet available, to be accessible to more people in various locations. He recognized the necessity of trade and its overall beneficial effect on the economy, but making money in that way might not be considered the most virtuous in his beliefs. He did not support people taking "excessive" profits from their trade sales.

See also 
 Mujaddid
 Nasîhatnâme

References

Notes

Citations

Sources

Further reading 

 Macdonald, Duncan B. (1899). "The life of al-Ghazzali", in Journal of the American Oriental Society. 20, p. 122 sqq.
 Laoust, H: La politique de Gazali, Paris 1970
 Campanini, M.: Al-Ghazzali, in Seyyed Hossein Nasr and Oliver Leaman, History of Islamic Philosophy 1996
 Campanini, Massimo, Ghazali, in Muhammad in History, Thought, and Culture: An Encyclopedia of the Prophet of God (2 vols.), Edited by C. Fitzpatrick and A. Walker, Santa Barbara, ABC-CLIO, 2014. 
 Watt, W. M.: Muslim Intellectual: A Study of al-Ghazali, Edinburgh 1963
 Zwemer, S. M. A Moslem Seeker after God, New York 1920
 Nakamura, K. "Al-Ghazali", Encyclopedia of Philosophy
 Dougan, A. The Glimpse: The Inner teaching of Abu Hamid Muhammad al-Ghazzali's Mishkat al-Anwar (The Niche for Lights) by Abdullah Dougan 
 A comparison between the philosophy of Ghazali and the Copenhagen Interpretation:

External links

 Translation of the Ihya ulum al-din (The Revival of Religious Sciences), Vol 1, Vol. 2, Vol. 3, Vol.4
 
 Full French text of the Deliverance from error, Préservatif contre l'erreur
 Al-Ghazali website
 Ghazali Series page at the Islamic Texts Society
 
 A detailed biography on Imam Ghazzali (450-505H) الغزَّالِي
 
 Ghazali and Islamic reform
 Ghazali and the Revival of Islamic Scholarship
 Full text of Incoherence of the Philosophers, from Al-Ghazali website
 Short commentary on The Alchemy of Happiness
 The Alchemy of Happiness, by Mohammed Al-Ghazzali, the Mohammedan Philosopher, trans. Henry A. Homes (Albany, N.Y.: Munsell, 1873). See original text in The Online Library of Liberty.
 "Al-Ghazali Contra Aristotle: An Unforeseen Overture to Science In Eleventh-Century Baghdad". Richard P. Aulie. PSCF 45. March 1994. pp. 26–46.
 Abu Hamid Al-Ghazali, in Intellectual Encounters
  Profession de Foi de l'Imam Al Ghazali

 
1050s births
1111 deaths
Autobiographers
Iranian Sufis
Mujaddid
Islamic philosophers
People from Tus, Iran
People from Mashhad
Shafi'is
Sufi psychology
Iranian Sufi religious leaders
Persian Sunni Muslim scholars of Islam
Iranian religious leaders
Asharis
Scholars from the Seljuk Empire
Islamic mirrors for princes
Economists of the medieval Islamic world
11th-century jurists
12th-century jurists
Iranian ethicists
Iranian logicians
Epistemologists
Metaphysicians
Psychology in the medieval Islamic world
Burials in Mashhad